József Hajdú (30 September 1884 – 24 June 1932) was a Hungarian actor. He was born in Debrecen and died in Budapest.

Selected filmography
 St. Peter's Umbrella (1917)
 Faun (1918)
 A kis lord (1918)
 Oliver Twist (1919)
 Lady Violetta (1922)

Bibliography
 Kulik, Karol. Alexander Korda: The Man Who Could Work Miracles. Virgin Books, 1990.

External links

1884 births
1932 deaths
Hungarian male film actors
Hungarian male silent film actors
20th-century Hungarian male actors
Hungarian male stage actors
People from Debrecen